The Rhode Island Heritage Hall of Fame is a non-profit, volunteer organization that recognizes those who have brought credit, prominence, or contributions to the heritage or history of Rhode Island.

History
The organization was founded and incorporated as a non-profit organization in 1965 to recognize the contributions of citizens of the state of Rhode Island. Since 2013, it has had a partnership with the Heritage Harbor Museum. Though the organization recognizes the contributions of any citizen, a separate listing of women inductees is maintained.

Criteria
The eligibility criteria for membership requires that significant contributions to the history or heritage of Rhode Island and is open to those born in the state, those who are residents when their notability occurred, and those who have permanent homes in Rhode Island.

Inductees
The hall inducts new members annually and includes both contemporary and historical Rhode Islanders.

References

Further reading

External links
Rhode Island Heritage Hall of Fame home page

Rhode Island-related lists
Lists of American women
Women's halls of fame
Lists of hall of fame inductees
Halls of fame in Rhode Island
State halls of fame in the United States
Organizations established in 1965
1965 establishments in Rhode Island
History of women in Rhode Island